Clifford Earl Lett (born December 23, 1965) is a retired American professional basketball player. Born in Pensacola, Florida, he played briefly in the NBA in the early 1990s, and played as a 6'3" (1.90 m) and 170 lb (77 kg) guard.

Lett attended the University of Florida and was signed in March 1990 by the Chicago Bulls to a 10-day contract, and then to a second in April. After he scored 4 points in as many games played with the team, he was not retained. His short NBA career lasted 7 more games in 1990-91 when he signed with the San Antonio Spurs on a 10-day contract in February 1991, but was waived after 20 days.

Notes

External links
NBA stats @ basketballreference.com

1965 births
Living people
African-American basketball players
American men's basketball players
Basketball players from Florida
Chicago Bulls players
Florida Gators men's basketball players
Pensacola Tornados (1986–1991) players
Point guards
San Antonio Spurs players
Sportspeople from Pensacola, Florida
Undrafted National Basketball Association players
21st-century African-American people
20th-century African-American sportspeople